Rio Hondo Independent School District is a public school district based in Rio Hondo, Texas, United States. In addition to Rio Hondo, the district serves the communities of Arroyo Colorado Estates, Lozano, and Villa del Sol.

In 2009, the school district was rated "academically acceptable" by the Texas Education Agency.

Schools
Rio Hondo High (grades 9-12)
Rio Hondo Middle School (grades 5-8)
Rio Hondo Elementary (prekindergarten - grade 4)

References

External links
 

School districts in Cameron County, Texas